Markdown is a lightweight markup language for creating formatted text using a plain-text editor. John Gruber and Aaron Swartz created Markdown in 2004 as a markup language that is appealing to human readers in its source code form. Markdown is widely used in blogging, instant messaging, online forums, collaborative software, documentation pages, and readme files.

The initial description of Markdown contained ambiguities and raised unanswered questions, causing implementations to both intentionally and accidentally diverge from the original version. This was addressed in 2014, when long-standing Markdown contributors released CommonMark, an unambiguous specification and test suite for Markdown.

History 

Markdown was inspired by pre-existing conventions for marking up plain text in email and usenet posts, such as the earlier markup languages setext (c. 1992), Textile (c. 2002), and reStructuredText (c. 2002).

In 2002 Aaron Swartz created atx and referred to it as “the true structured text format”. Swartz and Gruber then worked together to create the Markdown language in 2004, with the goal of enabling people "to write using an easy-to-read and easy-to-write plain text format, optionally convert it to structurally valid XHTML (or HTML)."

Its key design goal was readability, that the language be readable as-is, without looking like it has been marked up with tags or formatting instructions, unlike text formatted with ‘heavier’ markup languages, such as Rich Text Format (RTF), HTML, or even wikitext (each of which have obvious in-line tags and formatting instructions which can make the text more difficult for humans to read).

Gruber wrote a Perl script, which converts marked-up text input to valid, well-formed XHTML or HTML and replaces angle brackets and ampersands with their corresponding character entity references. It can take the role of a standalone script,  a plugin for Blosxom or a Movable Type, or of a text filter for BBEdit.

Rise and divergence 
As Markdown's popularity grew rapidly, many Markdown implementations appeared, driven mostly by the need for additional features such as tables, footnotes, definition lists, and Markdown inside HTML blocks.

The behavior of some of these diverged from the reference implementation, as Markdown was only characterised by an informal specification and a Perl implementation for conversion to HTML.

At the same time, a number of ambiguities in the informal specification had attracted attention.  These issues spurred the creation of tools such as Babelmark to compare the output of various implementations, and an effort by some developers of Markdown parsers for standardisation. However, Gruber has argued that complete standardization would be a mistake: "Different sites (and people) have different needs. No one syntax would make all happy."

Gruber avoided using curly braces in Markdown to unofficially reserve them for implementation-specific extensions.

Standardization 

From 2012, a group of people, including Jeff Atwood and John MacFarlane, launched what Atwood characterised as a standardisation effort. A community website now aims to "document various tools and resources available to document authors and developers, as well as implementors of the various Markdown implementations". In September 2014, Gruber objected to the usage of "Markdown" in the name of this effort and it was rebranded as CommonMark. CommonMark.org published several versions of a specification, reference implementation, test suite, and "[plans] to announce a finalized 1.0 spec and test suite in 2019." No 1.0 spec has since been released as major issues still remain unsolved. Nonetheless, the following websites and projects have adopted CommonMark: Discourse, GitHub, GitLab, Reddit, Qt, Stack Exchange (Stack Overflow), and Swift.

In March 2016 two relevant informational Internet RFCs were published:
  introduced MIME type .
  discussed and registered the variants MultiMarkdown, GitHub Flavored Markdown (GFM), Pandoc, and Markdown Extra among others.

Variants 
Websites like Bitbucket, Diaspora, GitHub, OpenStreetMap, Reddit, SourceForge, and Stack Exchange use variants of Markdown to facilitate discussion between users.

Depending on implementation, basic inline HTML tags may be supported. Italic text may be implemented by _underscores_ and/or *single-asterisks*.

GitHub Flavored Markdown 

GitHub had been using its own variant of Markdown since as early as 2009, adding support for additional formatting such as tables and nesting block content inside list elements, as well as GitHub-specific features such as auto-linking references to commits, issues, usernames, etc. In 2017, GitHub released a formal specification of its GitHub Flavored Markdown (GFM) that is based on CommonMark. It is a strict superset of CommonMark, following its specification exactly except for tables, strikethrough, autolinks and task lists, which GFM adds as extensions. GitHub also changed the parser used on their sites accordingly, which required that some documents be changed. For instance, GFM now requires that the hash symbol that creates a heading be separated from the heading text by a space character.

Markdown Extra 
Markdown Extra is a lightweight markup language based on Markdown implemented in PHP (originally), Python and Ruby.  It adds features not available with plain Markdown syntax. Markdown Extra is supported in some content management systems such as Drupal and TYPO3.

Markdown Extra adds the following features to Markdown:
 Markdown markup inside HTML blocks
 Elements with id/class attribute
 "Fenced code blocks" that span multiple lines of code
 Tables
 Definition lists
 Footnotes
 Abbreviations

LiaScript 
LiaScript is a Markdown dialect that was designed to create interactive educational content. It is implemented in Elm and TypeScript and adds additional syntax elements to define features like:

 Animations
 Automatic speech output
 Mathematical formulas (using KaTeX)
 ASCII art diagrams
 Various types of quizzes and surveys
 JavaScript is natively supported and can be attached to various elements, this way code fragments can be made executable and editable

Examples

Implementations 
Implementations of Markdown are available for over a dozen programming languages; in addition, many applications, platforms and frameworks support Markdown. For example, Markdown plugins exist for every major blogging platform.

While Markdown is a minimal markup language and is read and edited with a normal text editor, there are specially designed editors that preview the files with styles, which are available for all major platforms. Many general-purpose text and code editors have syntax highlighting plugins for Markdown built into them or available as optional download. Editors may feature a side-by-side preview window or render the code directly in a WYSIWYG fashion.

Some apps, services and editors that support Markdown as an editing format, including:

 Microsoft Teams: chat messages
 Discord: chat messages
 JotterPad: an online WYSIWYG editor that supports Markdown and fountain
 Doxygen: a source code documentation generator which supports Markdown with extra features
 RStudio: an IDE for R. It provides a C++ wrapper function for a markdown variant called sundown
 GitHub Flavored Markdown (GFM) ignores underscores in words, and adds syntax highlighting, task lists, and tables
 RMarkdown
 Nextcloud Notes: the default app for taking notes on the Nextcloud platform supports formatting using Markdown
 Joplin: a note-taking application that supports markdown formatting
 Simplenote
 Obsidian is note-taking software based on Markdown files.
 The GNOME Evolution email client supports composing messages in Markdown format, with the ability to send and render emails in pure Markdown format (Content-Type: text/markdown;) or to convert Markdown to plaintext or HTML email when sending.
 The Mozilla Thunderbird email client supports Markdown through the "Markdown here Revival" add-on.
 Kanboard uses the standard Markdown syntax as its only formatting syntax for task descriptions.
 Discourse uses the CommonMark flavor of Markdown in the forum post composer.
 Bugzilla uses a customized version of Markdown.

See also 
 Comparison of document markup languages
 Comparison of documentation generators
 Lightweight markup language
 Wiki markup

Explanatory notes

References

External links 
  for original John Gruber markup

Computer-related introductions in 2004
Lightweight markup languages
Open formats